Grand Slam is an American action drama television series that aired from January 28 to March 14, 1990. The series premiered after Super Bowl XXIV on CBS, but never found an audience and was cancelled after six episodes leaving two unaired.

Premise
The series was about two bounty hunters in San Diego.

Cast
John Schneider as Dennis "Hardball" Bakelenoff
Paul Rodriguez as Pedro N. Gomez
Larry Gelman as Irv Schlosser
Abel Franco as Al Ramirez
Lupe Ontiveros as Grandma Gomez

Episodes

See also
List of Super Bowl lead-out programs

References

External links

1990 American television series debuts
1990 American television series endings
American action television series
English-language television shows
CBS original programming
Super Bowl lead-out shows
Television shows set in San Diego
Television series by New World Television